Coleophora changaica is a moth of the family Coleophoridae. It is found in Spain, Algeria, Ukraine, southern Russia, Mongolia, Jordan and China.

The larvae feed on the leaves of Artemisia taurica and Artemisia turanica.

References

changaica
Moths described in 1975
Moths of Europe
Moths of Africa
Moths of Asia